is the debut studio album by Japanese singer-songwriter Gen Hoshino. It was released on 16 June 2010 as a limited edition vinyl LP on Kakubarhythm, and on 23 June 2010 on CD on Haruomi Hosono's Daisyworld Discs, and Speedstar Records in Japan. The album's title can be translated as "stupid songs" or "foolish songs".

Baka no Uta is the first solo release by Hoshino, who also leads Japanese instrumental band Sakerock. The only single from the album, "Kuse no Uta", was released as a digital download on 14 July 2010.

Track listing

CD

LP

Charts and sales

Weekly charts

Sales

References

External links
 Speedstar Records

2010 debut albums
Gen Hoshino albums